Otto Fuerbringer (September 27, 1910 – July 28, 2008) was an editor for the American news magazine Time.

Life
Fuerbringer was born in St. Louis, Missouri, U.S. to Ludwig and Anna Zucker Fuerbringer. His father was a Lutheran minister. He was the youngest of five children. As a student at Harvard, he edited the student newspaper The Harvard Crimson.

After graduating in 1932, he started working for the St. Louis Post-Dispatch, before being hired by Time in 1942. Reaching the rank of assistant managing editor in 1951, he was appointed managing editor in 1960. Later, as head of Time Inc.'s magazine-development group, he also introduced People and Money magazines. He did much to rejuvenate what was a rather austere publication, and once famously said of the journalism his staff did that "It only has to be true this week." Though a social conservative, Fuerbringer nevertheless did much to focus the magazine's attention on the counter-culture and the political and intellectual radicalism of the 1960s.

A 1964 issue dealt with the sexual revolution, while in 1967 the birth control pill.

During Fuerbringer's tenure as editor, the magazine's circulation rose from three to five million.l was discussed. His best known act as editor was probably his April 8, 1966 cover story "Is God Dead?" In the accompanying article he explored the role of religion in an increasingly secular society, and investigated a trend among contemporary theologians to write God out of the field of theology. Fuerbringer had initially been a supporter of the Vietnam War, but in 1968 he wrote an editorial conceding that the war was unwinnable.

Shortly before his death, in 2007, he wrote an autobiography, titled "On TIME". Fuerbringer was married to his wife Winona Gunn Fuerbringer for 68 years. The couple had four children. The Pulitzer Prize-winning journalist David Halberstam once said of Fuerbringer "He was the most controversial man within Time magazine, immensely influential, perhaps the most influential conservative of his generation in journalism, but outside the magazine almost no one knew his name." Time employees sometimes called him "Otto Fingerbanger" or "The Iron Chancellor" for his imperious demeanor.

Fuerbringer died in Fullerton, California in a retirement home.

Family
In 1940, Fuerbringer married Winona Gunn Fuerbringer, who survived him, and lived in Greenwich, Connecticut for more than 45 years. They had four children:  Jonathan, Peter, Alexis, and Juliana. His brother was Alfred Fuerbringer, a Lutheran seminary president.

See also
 Time
 People
 Money

References

Further reading

1910 births
2008 deaths
American magazine editors
American autobiographers
The Harvard Crimson people
Writers from St. Louis
American people of German descent
St. Louis Post-Dispatch people
Time (magazine) people